The Hairdresser of Harare is a novel by Tendai Huchu, first published in 2010. It chronicles an account of contemporary Zimbabwe seen through the eyes of the eponymous character of the book, a hairdresser working in Harare.

References 
 

2010 novels
2010 Zimbabwean novels
Novels set in Zimbabwe
Hairdressers
Harare in fiction
Novels by Tendai Huchu